Caleb Van "Tex" Warrington Jr. (March 21, 1921 – September 21, 1993) was a professional American football player for the All-America Football Conference's Brooklyn Dodgers. He played in 39 games between 1946 and 1948 after his collegiate career at William & Mary (1942) and Auburn (1944).

References

1921 births
1993 deaths
Auburn Tigers football players
Brooklyn Dodgers (AAFC) players
People from Dover, Delaware
Players of American football from Delaware
William & Mary Tribe football players